State Route 137 (SR 137) is a route that runs for  west to east that begins at the intersection of U.S. Route 2 (US 2) in Mercer and covers a large expanse of land, ending in the city of Belfast at an interchange with US 1 and SR 3.

SR 137 is the main road in the communities of Smithfield and Oakland, near the western terminus of the route.  SR 137 bypasses the downtown area of Waterville while SR 137 Business travels directly through it.

East of Waterville and Winslow, it meets US 202 and SR 9 in the town of China where they form a concurrency along one road until an intersection in the town of Albion. At this intersection, SR 137 becomes known as Belfast Road.  Next, SR 137 crosses through the towns of Freedom and Knox meeting SR 220 at Knox Corner.  In Morrill, SR 137 crosses SR 131 at an intersection. Eventually, at the end of the route, SR 137 merges with SR 7, and both end at US 1 and SR 3 in Belfast.

Major junctions

Business route

State Route 137 Business (SR 137 Bus.) is a business route through the towns of Waterville and Winslow. SR 137 goes through the city, but it does not go into the downtown area as SR 137 Bus. does.

Major junctions

References

External links

Floodgap Roadgap's RoadsAroundME: Maine State Route 137

137
Transportation in Somerset County, Maine
Transportation in Kennebec County, Maine
Transportation in Waldo County, Maine